The 2019 D.C. United season was D.C. United's 24th season of existence, and their 24th in Major League Soccer, the top flight of American soccer. The campaign was the club's first full season playing in Audi Field. Previously, United spent 2018 split between the Maryland SoccerPlex, Navy-Marine Corps Memorial Stadium, and Audi Field.

United finished the season in an upper-mid table position, finishing in 5th place out of 12 in the Eastern Conference, and 10th place out of 24 across the entire league. Outside of MLS, United competed in the 2019 U.S. Open Cup, where they were eliminated in the fifth round, and the 2019 MLS Cup Playoffs, where they were eliminated in the first round.

The 2019 season was also team captain, Wayne Rooney's, final year for United, where he finished the campaign with 11 goals in MLS play and 13 goals across all competitions.

Background

Review

Off season

The off-season began with D.C. United announcing that they would not pick up options or renew a number of contracts for players on the 2018 roster, including striker Darren Mattocks, one of the team's leading scorers in 2018. Homegrown midfielder Ian Harkes was allowed to seek a spot with a club that would offer more playing time. Defender Taylor Kemp announced his retirement. The team let long-time defender Nick DeLeon go, and he found his way to Toronto FC. Despite interest in returning Yamil Asad, the club was unable to work out an extension of his loan, or a complete transfer. Veteran defender Kofi Opare moved on to a new club, Travis Worra retired, and David Ousted was released to free up cap space and in international roster spot.

In Asad's stead, the team made a loan deal for Lucas Rodriguez, a young attacker from Argentina. Rodriguez was joined by another Argentinean, Leonardo Jara, a right back, who also came on a loan from Boca Juniors. The 2019 MLS SuperDraft brought D.C. United a fullback from Creighton University, Akeem Ward. The team signed two homegrown players, defender Donovan Pines, and midfielder Antonio Bustamante. The club also added veteran depth in goal, with Chris Seitz and Earl Edwards, Jr. As the pre-season neared an end, the team also was able to pick up some depth when Atlanta United F.C. released veteran Chris McCann to free up cap space. The final preseason move brought D.C. a back-up striker, MLS veteran Quincy Amarikwa.

The biggest news of the off-season was a move that did not happen. On the last day of the European transfer window, G.M. Dave Kasper flew to Paris along with Luciano Acosta, to try and complete a transfer to the leading Ligue 1 team, Paris St-Germain F.C. Reportedly the sides were just too far apart on the money involved to consummate the deal. This meant that Acosta entered the season on the final year of his deal with D.C. United.

Early season
D.C. United began the new season on a bright note in dismal weather. On a very cold and rainy night at Audi Field. United opened the season with a 2–0 victory over the defending MLS Cup champions, Atlanta United. Paul Arriola opened the scoring on the final kick of the half, assisted by Luciano Acosta on a corner kick by Wayne Rooney. In the second half, Lucho Acosta hit a knuckling shot that eluded Atlanta's goalkeeper, Brad Guzan. The team next traveled to New York City to play on NYCFC's famously small pitch. The goalkeeping for both teams was extraordinary with highlight-reel saves in a scoreless draw.

If it looked as if the team hadn't quite found its stride offensively in the first two matches, any concerns evaporated when the team returned to Audi Field. The visitors were Real Salt Lake and former D.C. United goalkeeper, Nick Rimando, making a  farewell tour in his final M.L.S. season. United were merciless in a 5–0 thrashing of the visitors. Captain Wayne Rooney tallied his first-ever MLS hat-trick, putting United out in from 3–0. Rooney had a PK, and a chip over the goalie, in the first half with Leonardo Jara getting his first assist. In the second half, Rooney finished off a pretty combination, with Junior Moreno getting the assist. With RSL down to 9 men, United poured it on. A golazo by Lucas Rodriguez on a corner kick served by Rooney was the newcomer's first goal for the club, and Ulises Segura finished off the scoring. United topped the Eastern Conference, with 7 points from 3 games and not a single goal allowed. A bye week the following week was not totally uneventful, as United signed its 3rd Homegrown player of the year, 16-year old forward Griffin Yow.

On the heels of a great performance by Toronto FC in the debut of their new Designated Player Alejandro Pozuelo, D.C. knew they had to get points in a road game in Orlando to maintain their top position in the Eastern Conference. Steven Birnbaum opened the scoring in the 6th minute heading in a Wayne Rooney corner kick. In the 30th minute, Rooney drew a foul in the opposite corner during the 30th minute. Facing a very sharp angle, Rooney nonetheless was able to bend the ball into the far corner to give the visitors a two-goal lead. D.C. would need that cushion to withstand a furious Orlando rally. Substitute Chris Mueller delivered a cross to the head of Dom Dwyer and Hamid was helpless to keep Dwyer's header out of the goal. It was the first goal D.C. had allowed in the 2019 season, coming 2/3 of the way through the 4th match. Mueller continued to shred the D.C. defense and nearly tied the match in the dying minutes when his header went off the post. The win left D.C. ahead of Columbus in the table, on goals, but with a game in hand on the Crew. However, Toronto trailed by only one point, with a game in hand themselves on D.C. Unfortunately, starting left back Joseph Mora suffered a first-half injury in a collision. Mora would undergo surgery later for a broken jaw, a loss which highlighted the team's lack of depth, including at the fullback position.

A sellout crowd turned out n a Saturday afternoon match at Audi Field, expecting a thrilling, competitive match from the teams topping the Eastern and Western Conference tables, but LAFC quickly ran D.C. off the pitch. Despite Hamid saving an early penalty shot, the visitors took advantage of sloppy midfield play by D.C. to turn turnovers into 3 first-half goals. In the second half, things went from bad to worse as Rooney was red-carded for a rash challenge after turning the ball over. L.A. finished with the man advantage and a 4–0 victory on the strength of a hat-trick by Diego Rossi. It was a difficult start to a busy, taxing 3 games in 8 days stretch and losing Rooney to the red card promised to add additional stresses in the team's next match 3 days later, against Montreal Impact. United began the match against Montreal without More (injury) and Rooney (red card suspension), and finished the game in worse shape thanks to injuries suffered by the two fullbacks who had started the match, Chris McCann and Leonardo Jara. Without Mora, United seemed unable to attack down either wing, and without Rooney, every effort to try to pierce the center of the Montreal defense ended in futility. United was unable to put a single shot on goal, but still managed a scoreless draw thanks to more sterling goaltending by Hamid.

D.C. fielded a new formation and three young Homegrown players making their first starts of the season for a road match in the altitude of Colorado Rapids home field. Things got off to a rough start as the Rapids' Benny Feilhaber was left unmarked on a corner kick and beat Hamid to put the home team in the lead. D.C. finally broke through with Acosta scoring on a blast from about 12 yards, assisted by a slight header touch-on by Donovan Pines getting his first minutes in an MLS match. That goal ended a 245-minute goal-scoring drought for D.C.U., and opened the floodgates. Three minutes later, Lucas Rodriguez set-up Chris Durkin for a blast across goalie Tim Howard and inside the far post. It was Durkin's first MLS goal, coming in his first start of the year. Five minutes later, "Titi" Rodriguez did the business all by himself, picking up a loose ball, charging through the Rapids' defense and then touching it past Howard to put the visitors up 3–1 before halftime. Colorado pulled one back in the 66th minute, as Feilhaber found the head of a poorly marked Kei Kamara. Frantically defending the last half-hour, United fended off a furious assault, requiring a headed stop on the line by Birnbaum. Despite recent struggles, the three points for the win moved D.C. United back to the top of the Eastern Conference table, though high-scoring Toronto F.C. was only 4 points back with 2 games in hand.

An interesting phenomenon began to take shape, as United continued to struggle at home while getting results on the road. United never really threatened the NYCFC goal in a 2–0 home loss, but got the three points with their first win in over a decade in Columbus, a 1–0 victory, secured by a first-half free kick goal by Rooney. Thanks to inconsistent result by other Eastern Conference teams, D.C. remained atop the conference table, as they headed on the road, for the first-ever match in newly opened Allianz Field against Minnesota United. Early on, it appeared the run of good road play would continue. D.C. dominated the early play and appeared to take the lead on want would have been Donovan Pines' first MLS goal, heading in a Rooney service. However, video review resulted in the goal being disallowed, controversially, for a possible interference by Brillant. The home team turned the pitch their way in the second half, and Hamid was finally beaten in the 82nd minute when a cross into the box was directed past him. The goal secured Minnesota's historic first win in their new stadium and it continued to expose D.C.'s offensive shortcomings. Over a stretch of 6 games in 21 days, D.C. was shut out in 4 of the last 6 games, and in one of the two others, they got one goal on a Rooney free kick. During those 6 games, their only goals in the run of play were 3 goals in an 8-minute stretch in Colorado.

As injuries continued to pile up for defenders, D.C. worked out a complicated exchange with F.C. Dallas to bring in fullback Marquinhos Pedroso, but Jara returned from a groin injury in time to start at home against Columbus Crew. The run of bad fortune seemed to be continuing when Acosta ran into the referee, and the resulting turnover sent the Crew on a fast break and an early goal. However, the goal was eventually wiped out after a check of the Video Assistant Replay (VAR). Shortly after the game resumed, D.C, won a free kick, which produced their own goal as Acosta pounced on a loose ball in the box to give D.C. its first goal and lead in 3 games. A check of VAR confirmed the goal. Then, in the last minute of first half stoppage time, another check of VAR led to a handball call and a penalty kick for D.C. Rooney scored the PK to put D.C. up 2–0. In the 61st minute, Jara took the ball away from an opponent at midfield and sped toward the goal. He attempted a back heel to Arriola and, though Jara didn't make good contact, Arriola was able to beat the defense to the ball and shot to the far corner of the goal to put the home side up 3–0, with no need to resort to the video replay. In the 76th minute, the Crew spoiled the shutout for DC, or really, Hamid spoiled it for himself. A corner kick was curling in just under the crossbar, but Hamid had the attempt well covered. Nonetheless, he let the ball slip between his hands and into the goal. United held on for a 3–1 win that might have been a too flattering scoreline, but still a welcome result for a team that had been shutout in the two preceding games. With a third of the season behind them, the team was tied with the Philadelphia Union for 1st place in the conference table, with Toronto F.C. 4 points behind but holding 3 games in hand.

Midseason 

D.C. United went into the middle third of the season, still struggling with an ever-growing list of injured. Rookie Donovan Pines had been ruled out for a month due to a knee ligament injury suffered in the win over Columbus. Recent signing Marquinhos Pedroso was forced into the starting lineup at left back, as D.C. kicked off a stretch of 3 games in 7 days, beginning with a Sunday evening match against Sporting KC at Audi Field. The visitors were struggling through even more injuries than D.C., bringing only 13 field players, but fought D.C. to a standstill until Arriola broke through with a curler for the game's only goal in the 79th minute. The victory meant D.C. kept pace with the Philadelphia Union as the teams remained tied for first place in the Eastern Conference.

Following the win over Sporting KC, United travelled for two road games to close the tough 3 games in seven days stretch, and the lineup was out under further pressure when Junior Moreno left to be with his Venezuelan family after the sudden passing of his father. Coach Olsen put together a midweek lineup that was a throwback to the good/bad old days of Bennyball, trying to rest as much of his best XI as possible. Akeem Ward made his first MLS appearance, starting at left back, while Jalen Robinson started on the other side. Durkin made a rare start before heading to join the United States Under-20 World Cup team, and Zoltan Stieber and Quincy Amarikwa led the attack, such as it was. Toronto F.C. allowed a couple of chances early on, but then launched an almost ceaseless assault on the D.C. goal. Hamid turned away 12 shots, and but only 2 of the 35 shots Toronto produced really threatened the goal. Hamid and Brillant together denied their former teammate Nick DeLeon and Jordan Hamilton put the rebound onto the crossbar. In the end, D.C. had to be quite pleased with a point in a scoreless draw.

Playing on short rest, with a very short roster, and on the road at Houston, D.C. United probably shouldn't have expected a result, but hopes rose when the second half began with a quick goal by Rooney to put the visitors in the lead. After the game passed the hour mark, the match went sour for D.C., surrendering two goals in two minutes. To make matters worse, Arriola took a straight red card in the 85th minute, and faced a two-game ban. The following week D.C. hoped to get back on the winning track with a road game against a New England Revolution side which was between managers, with Bruce Arena preparing to take over. First, a midweek exhibition against Spanish side Real Betis provided playing time for younger players. Despite losing the exhibition, fans celebrated homegrown Griffin Yow's first goal for the senior side. On the weekend, United and the Revolution played an uneventful first half. The Revolution went down a man in the second half when goalie Matt Turner took a straight red for a reckless challenge against Rooney. However, United failed to take advantage, and 5 minutes later it was the Revolution that struck, with Juan Agudelo putting the short-handed home team in the lead. United's sputtering offense wasn't helped by the man advantage, but a VAR decision to award D.C. a penalty kick in stoppage time, enabled the team to salvage a point on Rooney's ensuing PK goal. D.C. continued to lead Philadelphia in the table, but the Union had a game-in-hand, trailing by just one point, with a suddenly charging New York Red Bulls just off the pace.

Returning home for two games and missing a suspended Arriola, United made a couple of changes to the lineup, with Segura in Arriola's slot, and Chris Odoi-Atsem making his first start in a personal comeback from lymphoma. After Segura missed an early chance, the Chicago Fire responded with a free-kick goal by long-time D.C. nemesis C.J. Sapong on a terrific service from Nicolás Gaitán. The Fire went up 2–0 when a long-range shot was deflected by Moreno, leaving Hamid unable to stop it. Despite being badly outplayed, United seemed to have stunned the Fire with two quick goals before half-time. The first was a goal by a charging Segura set-up by Rooney. The second effort, coming in stoppage-time came when Acosta sent Rodriguez in on goal. Rodriguez' shot was stopped, but the ball seemed to pop back up to Rodriguez as he passed the goalie, and Rodriguez finished the play. However, the goal was disallowed for a handball after VAR review. Strong goalkeeping by Hamid kept DC in the game, and a long ball by Jara found Segura, who finished for his second goal of the game. United seemed to have completed the comeback when Acosta put the team in the lead, heading a Jara cross. However, the Fire salvaged a draw in stoppage time, when Bastian Schweinsteiger played the ball into the box with an overhead bicycle kick that found the head of Francisco Calvo, who deflected it past the onrushing Hamid. A draw was probably a fair result, but the referees' organization, PRO, later advised that VAR should have overruled the goal call for offside. The dropped points definitely deflated the emotions of the crowd and team after the impressive comeback seemed to have secured a win for the home team.

In the final match before a two-week break for the 2019 CONCACAF Gold Cup, D.C. were bossed around the pitch for much of the first half. An early injury to Canouse forced a formation switch which the visiting San Jose Earthquakes kept exploiting until M.L.S. all-time leading scorer Chris Wondolowski headed a ball off the post to take a 1–0 lead. United were outshot 17–3 in the half, but really turned the match around in the second half, before finally evening the score when Acosta finished the rebound off a shot by Jara. A second consecutive home draw significantly impacted United's standing as they trailed 3 other Eastern Conference teams, at least in points per game.

During the Gold Cup break, D.C. United opened its 2019 U.S. Open Cup campaign, playing its first-ever Open Cup match in Audi Field, against a familiar Cup foe, Philadelphia Union. Despite no upcoming MLS match, D.C. had to field a very makeshift lineup. Joseph Mora made his return from a broken jaw injury, but Jara was forced to play in defensive midfield for the first time, because the top 3 at the position were all unavailable, either for international duty, injury or card suspension. He was joined in the midfield by Antonio Bustamante, a homegrown signing getting his first action for D.C. United in a competitive match. The teams were scoreless through 90 minutes and the first overtime period. However, as rain had begun to pour down over the field, the visiting Union side broke through with what seemed a sure game-winner in the 113th minute. However, substitute Chris McCann drew United back even with a header off of a Rooney corner kick in the 118th minute, and Lucho Acosta drew a penalty in the box in the final minute. Rooney finished the penalty kick to win the match and send D.C. through to the next round, where they would host NYCFC.

In their Round of 16 match in the 2019 U.S. Open Cup, D.C. missed a great chance when Rooney's shot hit the post in the first minute. The visitors dominated the next half-hour, but against the run of play, United struck when a long ball from Segura found Rooney, who took it off his chest and beat NYCFC's goalie to give D.C. a lead in the 32nd minute. The lead vanished six minutes later when the central defense lost track of the visitor's striker, Alexandru Mitriță, who collected a pass over the defense and beat United keeper, Chris Seitz to draw even. Two and half minutes later, Rodriguez was knocked over and dispossessed. With no foul called, the visitors went quickly on the attack and struck to take a lead they never gave back. D.C. went out of the Open Cup with a 2–1 home loss.

After the short break for international play, MLS play resumed, with D.C. United having two home games in 4 nights. Due to ongoing tournaments, D.C. was still without two starting midfielders, Arriola and Moreno. In a midweek match versus Orlando City SC, D.C. didn't create a lot of chances, but gained 3 points with a 1–0 win, secured when Wayne Rooney caught Orlando goalkeeper Brian Rowe far off his line, and chipped for a goal from beyond the midfield stripe. An apparent second-half goal by Segura was ruled offside by VAR, but D.C. was able to keep yet another clean sheet. The win proved somewhat costly, as Mora's return to MLS play from his broken jaw was cut short because he suffered an ankle sprain likely to keep him out for weeks. Mora's absence created additional issues for Head Coach Ben Olsen, who didn't have a lot of great options at fullback and midfield. He chose to give Zoltan Stieber a start on the wing, despite speculation that he would soon be sold on in the summer window. McCann got the start at left back. Those moves proved fateful in the 19th minute, when Toronto FC midfielder Richie Laryea was able to get around Stieber along the end line and past McCann to set-up Nick DeLeon for an easy tap=in to give the visitors an early lead. It was an emphatic moment for DeLeon in his return to Audi Field, suiting up against his former D.C. United side for the first time. That goal nearly lasted to the final whistle, but VAR found a foul when Frédéric Brillant was tackled inside the box in the 90th minute. Rooney coolly scored the penalty kick to give United a 1–1 draw, and second place in the Eastern Conference table, one point off of Philadelphia Union's pace.

The poor run of form continued in a July Fourth match on the road against FC Dallas. The home team opened the scoring in the 6th minute, and made it 2–0 in the 65th minute. That ended the scoring, but things went from bad to worse for D.C. United when Acosta picked up a red card as he clumsily attempted to step over a fallen opponent. Acosta had only come on as a sub in the 58th minute, and his absence in a home match the following weekend was going to make it hard for the team to find chances even on the home pitch. The schedule didn't do D.C. any favor, as former head coach Bruce Arena returned to D.C. unbeaten in 7 games since taking over the helm of New England Revolution. Playing a new formation in Acosta's absence, United was out of sorts defensively and fell behind 2–0, before Jara restored some order, finishing on a cross from Arriola just before halftime. It was Jara's first goal for the club. In the second half, United began to figure things out, and Rodriguez drew a foul that left the Revolution playing a man down for the remainder. D.C. gained a point with an 86th-minute equalizer, as Quincy Amarikwa also got his first goal for D.C., with an acrobatic volley to score on a Wayne Rooney free kick service.

A compressed two-game road trip began against cellar-dwelling expansion side FC Cincinnati, and it proved to be a coming out party for Titi Rodriguez, who scored the team's first two goals and assisted Arriola on the fourth in a 4–1 drubbing of the home side, whose only goal came on penalty kick for a highly dubious handball call on the preceding free kick. The third goal was a masterwork engineered by Jara, who intercepted a pass, sidestepped a defender, and sent a long ball to Rooney that split the defense, and set up Rooney for an elegant finish that gave the team a two-goal lead, only 10 minutes after the team had lost their early lead. It was a convincing win, coming without Acosta who was still on suspension and without Hamid, who sat after violating a team rule. It was only the team's second win in a ten-game stretch, but a much-needed confidence boost going into a match in Atlanta, against a red hot Atlanta United F.C.

D.C. went to Atlanta as big underdogs, and the task didn't get any easier as Rooney was left out of the lineup. Still, for nearly 90 minutes, it seemed United's bunkering strategy might earn a point. Atlanta had better than 70 percent of the possession, but United arguably had the better arguments for goals, failing to convert on several counter-attacking runs. Atlanta's best chance had come when Josef Martinez drew penalty call in the second half, but Martinez missed the penalty kick. Atlanta finally broke through in the 89th minute, with a tap-in header by Pity Martinez. Josef Martinez added a second goal on a breakaway in stoppage time. The loss meant D.C. slipped to 3rd place in the standings, behind Atlanta, but D.C also had fewer points per game than the two New York area teams, both of which had games in hand. New England and Toronto were rising quickly, and Montreal received good news as Ignacio Piatti played for the first time in 2 months. As D.C. United headed into the final third of its schedule, even a place in the top 7 and a playoff position hardly seemed a sure thing.

Late season 

United made a couple of personnel moves, signing former University of Maryland star Gordon Wild, and releasing their own top pick, Akeem Ward to make room. In addition, D.C. and Zoltan Stieber agreed on terms for a mutual release of his contract. With only 11 games left in the season, United didn't look like favorites to win many of the remaining games. A visit to the lowly Chicago Fire might have been the best chance to win on the road, and Olsen finally had his best XI available. Still, he chose to continue to use the 3 centerback set he had been employing before out of need. Surprisingly, he left Mora on the bench, to start Rodriguez and Jara as wingbacks. The set-up never really threatened the Chicago goal. D.C. was only able to secure a road draw thanks to Hamid's usual strong goalkeeping and some surprising defensive brilliance from Brillant, whose interventions denied three certain goal-scoring opportunities. Meanwhile, Montreal, led by a healthy Piatti, posted a convincing 4–0 over Philadelphia, 4–1 win by New England, and some brilliance by a healthy Jozy Altidore led Toronto to a victory.

Although D.C. United still sat in third place, the week's results left the fan base wondering if the team would be able to qualify for the playoffs. The release of Steiber opened up an international player slot and perhaps some cap space to go abroad to find someone to boost the attack. The team was also giving a trial to former U.S.A. international, Jose Francisco Torres. Still, the team pondered its options, making no moves other than releasing McCann. With Canouse injured, the team was now down to central midfielders, neither of whom would finish the next match, at home against Philadelphia. United fell behind early thanks to Pines turnover that led to a Union goal by Alejandro Bedoya. Then Durkin went down with an injury. In the 40th minute, Moreno was issued a red card for a last man foul in the box. Though the Union failed to convert the spot kick, they did dd a goal just before halftime. The lead grew to 3–0 in the second half, before Brillant knocked in a loose ball to get United's only goal in a match that would end up a 5–1 drubbing by the conference-leading Philadelphia Union.

With Durkin joining Canouse among the ranks of the injured, D.C. urgently needed mores midfield strength, along with a striker up top. In the end, D.C. made a flurry of moves at the transfer deadline, adding former Crew and Galaxy striker Ola Kamara and trading for long-time nemesis midfielder Felipe Martins and L.A. Galaxy winger Emmanuel Boateng. This all came on the heels of an announcement that Wayne Rooney would return to English football at the end of the MLS season.

Due to an illness, Rooney wasn't fit to make the pitch for the Sunday night home match against Zlatan Ibrahimovic and L.A. Galaxy. Olsen also kept Lucho Acosta out of the starting lineup, which left a sell-out crowd expecting another thrashing by a more potent visiting club. Ibrahimovic would set a league record for most shots by a player in one game, but he was unable to convert any of the shots into goals. D.C. surprised everyone, thanks to the usual great goaltending by Hamid, a goal line clearance by Rodriguez, good central midfield play by Martins and Jara filling in for the team's usual starters, and goals by Arriola and Rodriguez, sandwiching the lone Galaxy score. The surprising win left United clinging to 3rd place in the standings.

United needed an injection of coincidence, which seemed to come with Rooney's return to the lineup. On a trip to Vancouver, United enjoyed the better of possession and the number of chances, but the team failed to convert, whereas Vancouver Whitecaps did finish a chance in the 18th minute and held on for a 1–0 win. A midweek rivalry match at home against New York Red Bulls didn't go much better. The visitors took the lead in the 6th minute after a defensive miscue. Then, Rooney was shown a red card for an off-the-ball incident as players jockeyed for position as D.C. defended a corner kick. United caught a break when a NYRB was shown a second yellow for a foul just before halftime. Ola Kamara notched his first goal in a D.C. United uniform with a stunning curler in the 55th minute and momentum seemed to be heading in the home side's direction. However, a very dubious penalty was called against D.C. just 3 minutes later (and no video review was ordered). The resulting successful spot kick was the difference in a crucial home loss against a team battling with D.C. for playoff position. Without Rooney in the lineup, D.C. lost its third straight match in a road match against Philadelphia Union. Once again, the Union simply ran D.C off the pitch, on the strength of 3 first-half goals. Acosta pulled one back in the second half, but the 3–1 loss left D.C. on the precipice of falling out of playoff position.

With Rooney again out of the lineup, United didn't figure to feature much offense in a trip to Montreal, but the team showed unusual clinical finishing in a 3–0 road win. Kamara scored first as free kick deflected through the defensive wall and provided the new D.C. striker with a straightforward chance, with only a helpless goalie to beat. Arriola scored a few minutes later on a breakaway, when a Hamid kick deflected into his path. Finally, Kamara finished off a well-worked corner kick with a header, assisted by Brillant and Martins. The win left the team with a decent chance of securing a home playoff match over their final four matches.

A week later, D.C. notched a second consecutive road win, with one of the more unlikely results of the season, a 1–0 win in Portland, over Portland Timbers. D.C. took the lead on an own goal coming on what seemed an otherwise harmless cross by Segura into the box, with no D.C. player in position to finish. D.C. probably deserved a second goal in the 38th minute, as a Rooney corner kick ricocheted off a pair of Timbers players including the goalie, and appeared to have crossed the line, before being cleared by former D.C. United academy player Eryk Williamson. A television replay appeared to show a goal, but VAR did not have that angle, and upheld the on-field no goal decision, relying on a different angle which was at best unclear if the entire ball had cleared the line. Portland controlled 2/3 of the possession, with most of the second half being played in D.C.'s defensive third, but were unable to find the tying goal, having struck the frame of the goal on several shots. With only 3 games left in their schedule, the result appeared to solidify D.C.'s playoff prospects. The team remained even with Toronto in a race for 4th place and the final home-field advantage spot in the opening round, but Toronto held a tie-breaking edge with a better goal differential.

Thanks to results for other teams on Saturday, United came into a Sunday night home match against Seattle Sounders FC knowing they had already qualified for the playoffs, but in a three-way struggle to gain home field in the opening round. Toronto had squandered a rare chance to gain a road win against the league-leading LAFC, surrendering a penalty kick in stoppage time. D.C. capitalize on the opportunity, playing perhaps their most complete match since their 5–0 rout of Real Salt Lake in the third match of the season, over six months earlier. Titi Rodriguez gave D.C. an early lead when he collected a deflection in the 18-yard box and drilled a shot into the corner of the goal. In the second half, a Rooney free kick found Brillant, who tapped in for the clinching goal. The win left United in 4th place, just one point on top of New York Red Bulls, ahead of a crucial match in Red Bull Arena. Unsurprisingly, D.C. United was satisfied with a bunkering strategy against the Red Bulls. Thanks to a goal-line clearance by Brillant and a spectacular save by Hamid, the team secured a scoreless draw and held on to the 4th spot in the Eastern Conference, heading into the final weekend. Unfortunately, Rooney would once again be sidelined in the final match, thanks to a suspension for yellow-card accumulation.

On the final day of the regular season, United's position was boosted by Montreal Impact taking an early 2–0 lead over the Red Bulls, but when Toronto F.C. went ahead of Columbus Crew, D.C. still needed a win against the league's worst team FC Cincinnati to gain the home-field advantage in the opening playoff match. That result seemed all but inevitable when two Cincinnati players were ejected late in the first half. D.C. United apparently scored on the restart, but the goal was overturned by video review. Over the final 55 minutes of play, despite the two-man advantage, D.C. was unable to score. As a result, D.C. ended the season tied with Toronto in the table but moved into 5th place because Toronto had a +5 goal differential, one goal better than D.C's +4 goal differential, which served to highlight the significance of several officiating errors that had deprived D.C. of deserved goals.

MLS Cup Playoffs 

DC United traveled to Toronto for their opening round match in the 2019 MLS Cup Playoffs, where they seemed to destined to end their season and end the Wayne Rooney and Luciano Acosta era. D.C. did trail for an hour after surrendering a goal on the 35th minute, but a stoppage time goal by Titi Rodriguez in the second half stunned the home side, giving the visitors new life. The Extra Time period showed just how cruel the game can be though. D.C. United's defense suffered an epic collapse, surrendering 4 goals in the overtime period, ending the season with a 5–1 loss.

Non-competitive

Preseason exhibitions

Midseason exhibitions

Postseason exhibitions

Competitive

MLS

MLS Cup

U.S. Open Cup

Squad information

Statistics

Appearances and goals

Discipline

Summary

Awards

Transfers and loans

Transfers in

MLS SuperDraft picks

Loan out

Transfers out

See also 
 2019 Loudoun United FC season

References 

D.C. United seasons
Dc United
Dc United
Dc United